Saraburi may refer to:
Saraburi, capital of Saraburi Province, Thailand
Saraburi Province, Thailand
Mueang Saraburi district, Thailand